Tony Petitti is the former president of sports and entertainment of Activision Blizzard. 

He was formerly the chief operating officer of Major League Baseball. He succeeded Rob Manfred in the position on January 25, 2015, after Manfred became Commissioner of Baseball. He previously served as the president and chief executive officer of the MLB Network, where he oversaw all of the network's day-to-day operations.

Career
Petitti attended Haverford College, where he majored in economics before attending Harvard Law School. He worked for two years at the law firm of Cadwalader, Wickersham & Taft before joining ABC Sports in 1988 as general attorney.  After being named vice president of programming, where he was responsible for acquiring and scheduling ABC Sports programming, he was hired by CBS in 1997 as senior vice president of business affairs and programming. In December 2005, Pettiti was named executive vice president, CBS Sports and is "responsible for all day-to-day operations of CBS Sports, " where he was largely responsible for the network's NFL coverage. "Basically, I’m responsible for everything you see on Sunday."

It was announced on January 3, 2008, that Petitti would be placed in charge of day-to-day operations of CSTV, the college sports network that was absorbed into CBS sports, effectively replacing network co-founder Brian Bedol, who had been serving as president of CSTV since the network was purchased by CBS Corporation in 2005.  CSTV was renamed the CBS College Sports Network on March 16, 2008, and eventually evolved to become CBS Sports Network.

In April 2008 Pettiti left CBS to become the head of MLB Network, which launched in January 2009.

References

American television executives
Living people
Year of birth missing (living people)
American lawyers
Harvard Law School alumni
American Broadcasting Company executives
CBS executives
American chief operating officers
Haverford College alumni
Major League Baseball executives
People associated with Cadwalader, Wickersham & Taft

He currently works for Activison Blizzard As of 2021 in the Sports and Entertainment Sector.